Stadio Degli Ulivi is a multi-purpose stadium in Andria, Italy. 

It is mainly used for football matches and hosts the home matches of  Lega Pro side Fidelis Andria. 

The stadium has a capacity of 9,140 spectators.

Football venues in Italy
Multi-purpose stadiums in Italy